For the mountain in California formerly named Summit Peak, see Mount Ina Coolbrith.

Summit Peak, elevation , sits on the Continental Divide in southern Colorado.  The mountain is the highest point in the South San Juan Wilderness.

See also

List of mountain peaks of North America
List of mountain peaks of the United States
List of mountain peaks of Colorado
List of Colorado county high points

References

External links

Mountains of Colorado
Mountains of Archuleta County, Colorado
North American 4000 m summits
Great Divide of North America
San Juan Mountains (Colorado)